The Oklahoma Secretary of Health was a member of the Oklahoma governor's Cabinet. The secretary is appointed by the governor, with the consent of the Oklahoma Senate, to serve at the pleasure of the governor. The secretary served as the chief advisor to the governor on public health issues and needs.

The current secretary of health is Kevin Corbett, who was appointed by Governor Kevin Stitt in 2020, following the departure of Jerome Loughridge.

Overview
The Secretary of Health was established in 1986 to provide greater oversight and coordination to the public health and mental hygiene activities of the state government. The position was established, along with the Oklahoma governor's Cabinet, by the Executive Branch Reform Act of 1986. The Secretary advises the governor on public health policy and advises the state's public health agencies on new policy as directed by the governor. The secretary also provides the overarching management structure for the state's public health services in order to deliver improved public services while eliminating redundancies and reducing support costs in order to more effectively and efficiently run the agencies in a unified manner. As the state's chief public health official, the secretary oversees vaccinations, disease prevention, mental health services, substance abuse treatment, and emergency health responses. The secretary also is responsible for regulation of the State health delivery system, overseeing state-managed public hospitals, health-related professional licensure, as well as overseeing the state's Medicaid program.

Oklahoma state law allows for Cabinet secretaries to serve concurrently as the head of a state agency in addition to their duties as a Cabinet secretary. Historically, the Secretary of Health has also served as either the commissioner of the Oklahoma State Department of Health or the commissioner of the Oklahoma Department of Rehabilitation Services. However, former secretary Loughridge did not share this role with either position.

Under the administration of Kevin Stitt, the cabinet position is labeled as the Secretary of Health and Mental Health, emphasizing its role in overseeing the Health Department and the Department of Mental Health and Substance Abuse Services. In previous administrations, the position is consolidated with the Oklahoma Secretary of Human Services into the position of Oklahoma Secretary of Health and Human Services, as was the case under governors Frank Keating and Mary Fallin.

The secretary, unless filling an additional role which carries a greater salary, is entitled to annual pay of $85,000. Loughridge, however, did not take a salary.

Budget
The Secretary of Health oversees a budget for Fiscal Year 2020 of $6.7 billion. The budget authorization is broken down as follows:

Agencies overseen
The secretary of health oversees the following state entities:
Department of Health
Department of Mental Health and Substance Abuse Services
Health Care Authority
Tobacco Settlement Endowment Trust

List of secretaries

References

External links
 Members of the Governor's Cabinet
 State biography of Cabinet Secretary Terri White

Health
Health, Secretary of